The Apostolic Nunciature to China is the diplomatic mission of the Holy See to the Republic of China. The Republic of China is now more commonly referred to as “Taiwan”. However, as far as the Vatican is concerned, the Republic of China is the state of “China”. The Holy See does not have a diplomatic mission in, or diplomatic relations with, the People's Republic of China (PRC). The Apostolic Nunciature to China is located at 7–1, Lane 265, Heping East Road Section 2, Daan District, Taipei.

The rank of a nuncio is equivalent to that of an ambassador. The post has been vacant since 1971 when UN Resolution 2758 was passed by which the representatives of the PRC government were recognized as the only legitimate representatives of China. Since then the mission has been headed by a chargé d'affaires.

History
Efforts by both the Catholic Church and the Chinese government to establish direct contact began in the late Qing dynasty. Direct contact would break the restrictions from the Protectorate of missions of France. The Catholic Church responded to a request by Li Hongzhang of the Qing Empire on 3 May 1870, and established diplomatic ties. The church sent Archbishop Antonio Agliardi to China in early August as plenipotentiary with regard to diplomatic affairs. In July 1918, the Holy See and the Beiyang Government of the Republic of China agreed to send Giuseppe Petrelli and Dai Chenlin as their respective diplomats. However, this did not succeed due to objections from France.

Relations between the Republic of China and the Holy See strengthened in 1922 when Celso Benigno Luigi Costantini was appointed as an Apostolic Delegate to China, although he had no diplomatic status. Official diplomatic ties were established in 1946 when Antonio Riberi assumed office as Apostolic Internuncio to China.

In 1951 Riberi left mainland China following the relocation of the Government of the Republic of China to Taiwan. In 1966 the Apostolic Internunciature in China was upgraded to an Apostolic Nunciature. Since then, the Apostolic Nunciature to China sits at Taipei, Taiwan. Giuseppe Caprio became the first Apostolic Pro-Nuncio to China.

On 25 October 1971 the United Nations General Assembly passed a resolution recognizing the People's Republic of China as sole representative of China, and the Holy See recalled the Apostolic Nuncio. Since that time, diplomatic affairs have been administered by chargés d'affaires.

List of representatives

Apostolic Delegates to China (1922–1946)
In 1922, Father Celso Benigno Luigi Costantini was appointed by the Holy See as Apostolic Delegate to China, without diplomatic status.

Apostolic Internuncios to China (1946–1966)

Apostolic Nuncios to China (1966–present)

Chargés d'affaires

See also
China–Holy See relations
Foreign relations of Taiwan
Foreign relations of China
Foreign relations of the Holy See
Holy See–Taiwan relations
List of diplomatic missions of the Holy See
List of heads of the diplomatic missions of the Holy See
Republic of China Ambassador to the Holy See

References

External links
Apostolic Nunciature to China - Gcatholic.org
About the embassy in China - tianzhu.org 
Nunciature to China - catholic-hierarchy.org

China
Holy See
Ambassadors to Taiwan
Diplomatic missions in Taipei
Taiwan diplomacy-related lists